The 1897 Pittsburgh College football team was an American football team that represented Pittsburgh Catholic College of the Holy Ghost—now known as Duquesne University—during the 1897 college football season. It was the first Pittsburgh College team to consist entirely of students from the college. J. P. Wolfe served in his first and only season as the team's head coach.

Schedule

References

Pittsburgh College
Duquesne Dukes football seasons
Pittsburgh College football